Romanos Iasonas Alyfantis (born 21 March 1986) is a breaststroke swimmer from Greece. He won a silver medal at the 2005 Mediterranean Games, and represented his native country at the 2004 and 2008 Olympics.

References

External links
 

1986 births
Living people
Greek male swimmers
Male breaststroke swimmers
Olympic swimmers of Greece
Swimmers at the 2004 Summer Olympics
Swimmers at the 2008 Summer Olympics
Panathinaikos swimmers
Mediterranean Games silver medalists for Greece
Mediterranean Games bronze medalists for Greece
Swimmers at the 2005 Mediterranean Games
Swimmers at the 2009 Mediterranean Games
Swimmers at the 2018 Mediterranean Games
Mediterranean Games medalists in swimming
Swimmers from Athens